Palinacousis is an auditory form of perseveration—continuing to hear a sound after the physical noise has disappeared.  The condition is often associated with lesions of the temporal lobe.

See also
 Earworm

References

Sound
Rare diseases